Stewart Enterprises, Inc. was the second largest provider of funeral and cemetery services in the United States. The company is headquartered in Jefferson, Louisiana and employs nearly 5,400 people in 218 funeral homes and 140 cemeteries in 24 states and Puerto Rico. The company was publicly traded and listed on NASDAQ under the ticker symbol STEI.  Frank B. Stewart, Jr. serves as chairman of the board. Thomas J. Crawford is president and chief executive officer. Thomas M. Kitchen is senior executive vice president and chief financial officer. In December 2013, Service Corporation International completed its previously announced acquisition of Stewart Enterprises at a $1.4 billion price.

History
Stewart Enterprises was founded in New Orleans in 1910 by Albert Stewart, owner of the Acme Realty Company, when his real estate business acquired the three St. Vincent de Paul Cemeteries and the St. Vincent de Paul Marble Shop, a company that built monuments for the cemeteries. Stewart kept both businesses, and they flourished. By 1931, his sons Frank Sr. and Charles incorporated the business as the Acme Marble & Granite Co. In 1949, the company established Lake Lawn Park Cemetery in New Orleans and developed a large perpetual-care community mausoleum with more than 31,000 crypts. In 1969, under the tutelage of President Frank B. Stewart, Jr. (Albert's grandson), the company purchased the adjoining Metairie Cemetery.

Expansion
In the 1980s, Stewart expanded from its base in Louisiana and Texas to Florida, Maryland, Washington, D.C., and West Virginia. The company went public in 1991, and, over the next several years, expanded to 30 states and 12 countries. In 1997, the firm announced a partnership with the Archdiocese of Los Angeles for the building and construction of funeral homes on nine of the Church's cemeteries and management of preneed sales at 11 cemeteries. Stewart Enterprises celebrated its centennial on April 26, 2010.

Associations
Stewart's associated businesses and affiliations include the Acme Mausoleum Corporation in Texas and Louisiana; Tributes.com, an online memorial site; and Investor Trust, Inc. (ITI), a wholly owned, Texas-based investment firm for preneed trust and the company's portfolio. Stewart owns a number of historic cemeteries including Metairie Cemetery (Metairie, La.), Royal Palm Memorial Gardens and Funeral Home (West Palm Beach, Fla.), and Wisconsin Memorial Park (Brookfield, Wis.).

Approximately 41 percent of Stewart's business is located in California, Florida and Texas, states that have high proportions of senior citizens.

References

External links
 Stewart Enterprises Official Website

Companies based in Louisiana
American companies established in 1910
Companies formerly listed on the Nasdaq
Death care companies of the United States
1910 establishments in Louisiana